Janet Martin Welch was the New York State Librarian from 1996 to 2008. She was the first woman to hold the position. She was the daughter of library science pioneer Lowell Arthur Martin.

Welch was an early internet advocate, recognizing the power of the "information superhighway". She prioritized bringing web access to libraries across New York state in the 1990s before most homes were web connected.

Following the events of September 11, 2001, Mrs. Welch oversaw efforts to collect and preserve artifacts from the World Trade Center at the New York State Museum.

Awards
American Library Association Award for Nationwide Library Legislative Success and Improvement of Library Services for the American People
 NYLA President's Award for development and leadership of the nationwide Public Awareness of Libraries Campaign

References

American librarians
American women librarians
Living people
Year of birth missing (living people)
21st-century American women